Donald Ward (born  – death unknown) was an English professional rugby league footballer who played in the 1930s and 1940s, and coached in the 1950s.

Background
Donald Ward was born in Dewsbury, West Riding of Yorkshire, England.

Playing career

Challenge Cup Final appearances
Donald Ward played  in Bradford Northern's 8-3 aggregate victory over Wigan in the 1943–44 Challenge Cup Final during the 1943–44 season; the 0–3 defeat at Central Park, Wigan on Saturday 15 April 1944, and the 8–0 victory at Odsal Stadium, Bradford on Saturday 22 April 1944, played  in the 8–4 victory over Leeds in the 1946–47 Challenge Cup Final during the 1946–47 season at Wembley Stadium, London on Saturday 3 May 1947, played  in the 3–8 defeat by Wigan in the 1947–48 Challenge Cup Final during the 1947–48 season at Wembley Stadium, London on Saturday 1 May 1948, and played  in the 12–0 victory over Halifax in the 1948–49 Challenge Cup Final during the 1948–49 season at Wembley Stadium, London on Saturday 7 May 1949.

Bradford Northern played in five of the six Challenge Cup finals between 1944 and 1949, the first two finals; the 1943–44 Challenge Cup Final against Wigan, and the 1944–45 Challenge Cup Final against Huddersfield were played over two-legs, five Bradford Northern players played in all five of these finals, they were; Eric Batten, Vic Darlison, Donald Ward, Ernest Ward, and Frank Whitcombe.

Genealogical information
Donald Ward was the older brother of the rugby league footballer; Ernest Ward.

References

External links
Image 'Donald Ward - Official Club photograph - 01/01/1939' at rlhp.co.uk
Image 'Donald Ward - Official Club photograph - 01/01/1939' at rlhp.co.uk
Image 'Challenge cup winning side. - The Bradford Northern Challenge Cup winning side of 1944. Northern beat Wigan 8-0 after losing 3-0 away from home in the first leg. - 22/04/1944' at rlhp.co.uk
Image 'Championship winning team 1945 - Bradford Northern's Championship winning team of 1945. - 01/01/1945' at rlhp.co.uk
Image 'Team to visit Barrow in the Cup 1946 - The team to visit Barrow in the 1946 Challenge Cup waits to board the coach. - 07/03/1946' at rlhp.co.uk
Image 'The 1947 Team - The 1947 Bradford Northern team that won at Wembley. - 01/01/1947' at rlhp.co.uk
Image 'Northern at Fartown - The Northern side that took on Huddersfield in 1948. Bradford won 7-2 at Fartown. - 30/03/1948' at rlhp.co.uk
Image '1948 Challenge Cup Final - A world record crowd of 91,465 saw Bradford Northern lose to Wigan by 8 points to 3 in this 1948 Final at Wembley. Here King George VI is seen being introduced to the Bradford Northern side. - 01/05/1948' at rlhp.co.uk
Image '1948/49 Challenge Cup and Yorkshire Cup Winners  The 1948/9 Yorkshire Cup and Challenge Cup Winners. Date: 01/01/1949' at rlhp.co.uk
Image 'Ernest Ward holds the Championship Trophy - Dennis Trotter points to the Championship Trophy as Ernest Ward holds the Cup. - 04/06/1981' at rlhp.co.uk
Image 'Northern Greats - A collection of Northern Greats return to the pitch to celebrate 50 years at Odsal Stadium. - 26/08/1984' at rlhp.co.uk
Search for "Donald Ward" at britishnewspaperarchive.co.uk
Search for "Don Ward" at britishnewspaperarchive.co.uk
 (archived by web.archive.org) History at wykearlfc.pwp.blueyonder.co.uk
 (archived by archive.is) History at wykearlfc.pwp.blueyonder.co.uk

1910s births
Bradford Bulls players
Celtic de Paris coaches
Celtic de Paris players
Dewsbury Rams players
English rugby league coaches
English rugby league players
Place of death missing
Rugby league five-eighths
Rugby league halfbacks
Rugby league players from Dewsbury
Year of death missing